Harrison 'Harry' Libbey (November 22, 1843 – September 30, 1913) was a U.S. Representative from Virginia's 2nd congressional district.

Biography
Born in Wakefield, New Hampshire, Libbey attended the common schools.
He moved to Virginia and settled in Hampton in 1863.
He engaged in mercantile pursuits.
He was appointed one of the presiding justices of Elizabeth City County, Virginia, in 1869.

Libbey was elected as a Readjuster to the Forty-eighth Congress and reelected as a Republican to the Forty-ninth Congress (March 4, 1883 – March 3, 1887).
He engaged in the oyster industry.
He served as chairman of the Republican county committee.
He was appointed postmaster of Hampton, Virginia, January 18, 1907, and served until his death in Hampton, Virginia, on September 30, 1913.
He was interred in St. John's Cemetery.

Electoral history

1882; Libbey was elected to the U.S. House of Representatives defeating Republican John Frederick Dezendorf and Democrat Richard C. Marshall, winning 49.68% of the vote.
1884; Libbey was re-elected defeating Democrat Marshall, winning 58.3% of the vote.

Sources

1843 births
1913 deaths
American merchants
People from Wakefield, New Hampshire
People from Elizabeth City County, Virginia
Virginia postmasters
Readjuster Party members of the United States House of Representatives
Readjuster Party politicians
Politicians from Hampton, Virginia
Republican Party members of the United States House of Representatives from Virginia
19th-century American politicians
19th-century American businesspeople